Khafkuiyeh (also Romanized as Khāfkū’īyeh; also known as Khāfkūh) is a village in Bezenjan Rural District, Bezenjan District, Baft County, Kerman Province, Iran. At the 2006 census, its population was 253, in 37 families.

References 

Populated places in Baft County